Alex Silva (born October 10, 1982) is a Brazilian mixed martial artist, currently competes in the Strawweight division for the ONE Championship, he is a former ONE Strawweight World Champion.

Mixed martial arts career

ONE Championship
Silva made his debut against Geje Eustaquio on February 11, 2012 at ONE FC: Battle of Heroes. He lost the bout via unanimous decision.

Silva faced Rene Catalan on April 5, 2013 at ONE FC: Kings and Champions. He won the fight via armbar submission in the first round.

Silva faced Ruel Catalan on December 11, 2015 at ONE: Spirit of Champions. He won the bout via kneebar submission in the first round.

Silva faced Robin Catalan on March 18, 2016 at ONE: Union of Warriors. He won the bout via arm-triangle choke submission in the first round.

Silva faced former ONE Strawweight World Championship challenger Roy Doliguez on February 11, 2017 at ONE: Throne of Tigers. He won the bout via armbar submission in the third round.

Silva faced Hayato Suzuki on November 10, 2017, at ONE: Legends of the World. He won the bout via armbar submission in the first round.

ONE Strawweight World Champion
Silva faced Yoshitaka Naito for the ONE Strawweight World Championship at ONE: Warriors of the World on December 9, 2017. He won the bout via unanimous decision and capture the ONE Strawweight World Championship.

Silva then faced Naito in a rematch on May 12, 2022, at ONE: Grit and Glory. He lost the bout and the title via split decision.

Post-championship reign
Silva faced Yosuke Saruta on December 7, 2018, at ONE: Destiny of Champions. He lost the fight via unanimous decision.

Silva faced Yoshitaka Naito in a third time on May 17, 2019, at ONE: Enter the Dragon. He lost the bout via unanimous decision.

Silva faced Stefer Rahardian on August 16, 2019, at ONE: Dreams of Gold. He won the fight via armbar submission in the second round.

Silva faced Peng Xue Wen on November 22, 2019, at ONE: Edge of Greatness. He won the fight via armbar submission in the second round.

Silva faced Joshua Pacio for the ONE Strawweight World Championship on January 31, 2020, at ONE: Fire & Fury. He lost the fight via split decision.

Silva faced Hiroba Minowa at ONE: Fists of Fury 3 on February 26, 2021 and aired on March 19, 2021. He lost the fight via split decision.

Silva faced Miao Li Tao at ONE: Battleground 2 on July 30, 2021 and aired on August 13, 2021. He won the fight via unanimous decision.

Silva faced Rene Catalan in a rematch at ONE: NextGen 3 on October 29, 2021 and aired on November 26, 2021. He won the fight via armbar submission in the first round.

Silva faced Adrian Mattheis on March 11, 2022, at ONE: Lights Out. He lost the fight via 5 second technical knockout in the second round. Though Silva protested referee Mohamed Sulaiman that he could still fight.

A rematch against Mattheis that took place on June 3, 2022, at ONE 158. He won the fight via heel hook submission in the first round. This win earned him the Performance of the Night award.

Silva faced Gustavo Balart on October 21, 2022, at ONE 162. At the weigh-ins, Balart failed the hydration test and was forced to take catchweight of 130.75 lbs, 5.75 lbs over the strawweight limit. He lost the fight via split decision.

Silva is scheduled to face Keito Yamakita on March 25, 2023, at ONE Fight Night 8.

Championships and accomplishments

Mixed martial arts
ONE Championship
ONE Strawweight World Championship (One time)
 Performance of the Night (One time)

Mixed martial arts record

|-
| Loss
| align=center| 12–8
| Gustavo Balart
| Decision (split)
| ONE 162 
| 
| align=center| 3
| align=center| 5:00
| Kuala Lumpur, Malaysia 
| 
|-
| Win
| align=center| 12–7
| Adrian Mattheis
| Submission (heel hook)
| ONE 158 
| 
| align=center| 1
| align=center| 3:34
| Kallang, Singapore
| 
|-
| Loss
| align=center| 11–7
| Adrian Mattheis
| TKO (punches)
| ONE: Lights Out
| 
| align=center| 2
| align=center| 0:05
| Kallang, Singapore
|
|-
| Win
| align=center| 11–6
| Rene Catalan
| Submission (armbar)
| ONE: NextGen 3
| 
| align=center| 1
| align=center| 3:35
| Kallang, Singapore
|
|-
| Win
| align=center| 10–6
| Miao Li Tao
| Decision (unanimous)
| ONE: Battleground 2
| 
| align=center| 3
| align=center| 5:00
| Kallang, Singapore
|
|-
| Loss
| align=center| 9–6
| Hiroba Minowa 
| Decision (split)
| ONE: Fists of Fury 3
| 
| align=center| 1
| align=center| 1:41
| Kallang, Singapore
|
|-
| Loss
| align=center| 9–5
| Joshua Pacio
| Decision (split)
| ONE: Fire & Fury
| 
| align=center| 5
| align=center| 5:00
| Pasay, Philippines 
| 
|-
| Win
| align=center| 9–4
| Peng Xue Wen
| Submission (armbar)
| ONE: Edge of Greatness
| 
| align=center| 2
| align=center| 4:45
| Kallang, Singapore 
|
|-
| Win
| align=center| 8–4
| Stefer Rahardian
| Submission (armbar)
| ONE: Dreams of Gold 
| 
| align=center| 2
| align=center| 4:55
| Bangkok, Thailand 
|
|-
| Loss
| align=center| 7–4
| Yoshitaka Naito
| Decision (unanimous)
| ONE: Enter the Dragon 
| 
| align=center| 3
| align=center| 5:00
| Kallang, Singapore
|
|-
| Loss
| align=center| 7–3
| Yosuke Saruta
| Decision (unanimous)
| ONE: Destiny of Champions
| 
| align=center| 3
| align=center| 5:00
| Kuala Lumpur, Malaysia
|
|-
| Loss
| align=center| 7–2
| Yoshitaka Naito
| Decision (split)
| ONE: Grit and Glory
| 
| align=center| 5
| align=center| 5:00
| Jakarta, Indonesia
| 
|-
| Win
| align=center| 7–1
| Yoshitaka Naito
| Decision (unanimous)
| ONE: Warriors of the World
| 
| align=center| 5
| align=center| 5:00
| Bangkok, Thailand 
| 
|-
| Win
| align=center| 6–1
| Hayato Suzuki
| Submission (armbar)
| ONE: Legends of the World
| 
| align=center| 1
| align=center| 1:22
| Pasay, Philippines
|
|-
| Win
| align=center| 5–1
| Roy Doliguez
| Submission (armbar)
| ONE: Throne of Tigers
| 
| align=center| 3
| align=center| 2:36
| Kuala Lumpur, Malaysia
|
|-
| Win
| align=center| 4–1
| Robin Catalan 
| Submission (arm-triangle choke)
| ONE: Union of Warriors
| 
| align=center| 1
| align=center| 4:25
| Yangon, Myanmar
| 
|-
| Win
| align=center| 3–1
| Ruel Catalan
| Submission (kneebar)
| ONE: Spirit of Champions
| 
| align=center| 1
| align=center| 3:53
| Pasay, Philippines
|
|-
| Win
| align=center| 2–1
| Rene Catalan
| Submission (armbar)
| ONE FC: Kings and Champions
| 
| align=center| 1
| align=center| 4:54
| Kallang, Singapore 
|
|-
| Loss
| align=center| 1–1
| Geje Eustaquio
| Decision (unanimous)
| ONE FC: Battle of Heroes
| 
| align=center| 3
| align=center| 5:00
| Jakarta, Indonesia 
|
|-
| Win
| align=center| 1–0
| Suchat Lukamkuha
| Submission (rear-naked choke)
| DARE 2/11
| 
| align=center| 1
| align=center| 2:12
| Bangkok, Thailand
| 
|-

See also
List of current ONE fighters

References

External links
 Alex Silva at ONE

1982 births
Living people
Brazilian male mixed martial artists
Strawweight mixed martial artists
Flyweight mixed martial artists
Mixed martial artists utilizing Brazilian jiu-jitsu
Brazilian practitioners of Brazilian jiu-jitsu
People awarded a black belt in Brazilian jiu-jitsu
People from São Paulo
Sportspeople from São Paulo (state)
ONE Championship champions
People from Ubatuba